Jolada rotti is an unleavened Indian bread made of sorghum bicolor
It is coarser than a roti. It can be either soft or hard in texture, compared to a khakhra or cracker with respect to hardness. The name literally translates as "sorghum bread". Jolada rotti is part of the staple diet of most of the districts of North Karnataka, where it is eaten with Pulse curries such as jhunka, yengai, shenga chutney or other assorted chutnies. Jowar rotti is also called as jawarichi bhakri in neighboring Maharastra.

See also
 List of Indian breads
 Lahoh

References

Karnataka cuisine
Indian breads
Unleavened breads
Flatbreads
Sorghum